Duganella sacchari is a bacterium of the genus Duganella in the Oxalobacteraceae family which was isolated with Duganella radicis from the rhizosphere of field-grown sugarcane.

References

External links
Type strain of Duganella sacchari at BacDive -  the Bacterial Diversity Metadatabase

Burkholderiales